Li Jing (Chinese: 李敬; born February 23, 1970) is a Chinese gymnast, world champion and Olympic medalist. He competed at the 1992 Summer Olympics in Barcelona where he received silver medals in rings, in parallel bars, and in team combined exercises.

World championships
Li Jing became world champion in parallel bars in 1989,in 1991 and in 1992

References

1970 births
Living people
Chinese male artistic gymnasts
Gymnasts at the 1992 Summer Olympics
Olympic gymnasts of China
Olympic silver medalists for China
Olympic medalists in gymnastics
Asian Games medalists in gymnastics
Gymnasts at the 1990 Asian Games
Gymnasts at the 1994 Asian Games
Asian Games gold medalists for China
Asian Games silver medalists for China
Asian Games bronze medalists for China
Medalists at the 1990 Asian Games
Medalists at the 1994 Asian Games
Medalists at the 1992 Summer Olympics
Medalists at the World Artistic Gymnastics Championships